The Martapura River is a river of southeast Borneo, Indonesia. It is a tributary of the Barito River. Other names for the river are Banjar Kecil River or Kayutangi River and due to many activities of Chinese merchants in the past in the downstream area also called China River. It merges with the Barito River in Banjarmasin, flowing from the source in Martapura, Banjar Regency, South Kalimantan.

Etymology 
The river name is taken from the city of Martapura, which was a capital of Banjar Kingdom in around 1630, specifically in the area of Kayu Tangi (hence also the name "Kayutangi River"). Another name is "Tatas River" (Indonesian: Sungai Tatas), pointing to the delta Tatas, which in 1787 was acquired by the Dutch East India Company (now the downtown of modern-day Banjarmasin).

Hydrology 
The upstream area is Riam Kanan Dam.

Geography
The river flows in the southeast area of Borneo with predominantly tropical rainforest climate (designated as Af in the Köppen-Geiger climate classification). The wettest month is February, with an average of  rainfall, and the driest is September, with a  rainfall.

Gallery

See also
List of rivers of Indonesia
List of rivers of Kalimantan

References

External links 

 China River (Martapura River) in a historical map

Rivers of South Kalimantan
Rivers of Indonesia